Bill Brunson was a college football player for the Mississippi A&M Aggies, captain of the 1927 team, and selected All-Southern.

References 

American football centers
Mississippi State Bulldogs football players
All-Southern college football players